Confucius (551– 479 BCE) was a Chinese thinker and social philosopher.

Confucius may also refer to:

Confucius (2010 film), a Chinese film directed by Hu Mei
Confucius (1940 film), a Chinese film directed by Fei Mu
Statue of Confucius (Houston), a 2009 bronze by Willy Wang in Houston, Texas, US
7853 Confucius, a main-belt asteroid
Confucius Institute, a non-profit public institute which aims at promoting Chinese language and culture
Confucius Peace Prize, a peace prize in China since 2010 
Confuciusornis, a genus of primitive crow-sized birds from the early Cretaceous Period
Confuciusornithidae, a family of primitive birds from the early Cretaceous Period
Confucius (leafhopper), a genus of leafhoppers in the order Hemiptera
Mirina confucius, a moth of the family Endromidae
Potanthus confucius, a butterfly of the family Hesperiidae 
 Chinese steamer Confucius, early gunboat of the Qing Dynasty
Kalangi Nathar, Indian Hindu saint, identified with Confucius